An electrician is a tradesman specializing in electrical wiring of buildings, stationary machines and related equipment. This is a list of notable people who have been electricians.

Australia
Laurie Brereton, politician
Colin Brooks, politician
Harry Jensen, unionist and politician
Gil Langley, cricketer
Ian Maxfield, unionist and politician
Josh McCrone, Rugby League player
William Laird Smith, unionist and politician, Minister for the Navy
Mike Symon, politician
Peter Turnbull, World War II fighter ace

Bermuda
Johnny Barnes, noted as a national institution for greeting commuters

Brazil
Roberto Azevêdo, diplomat
Delcídio do Amaral, politician
Silas Rondeau, politician

Canada
John Babcock, First World War veteran
David Bjornson, Progressive Conservative Member of Parliament 1988-1993 for Selkirk-Red River
David Price, politician
Fred Rose, politician and Soviet spy

France
Pierre Le Guennec, former possessor of many works by Picasso

Germany
Hermann Einstein, father of Albert Einstein. Hermann and his brother Jakob founded an electrical engineering company called Einstein & Cie.

Iceland
Guðmundur Gunnarsson, union leader

Ireland
Conor Cusack, hurler
Karl Shiels, actor

Israel
Dror Adani, convicted for conspiracy to murder 
Haim Corfu, politician
Moshe Flimann, politician
Alex Goldfarb, politician
Yeruham Zeisel, politician

New Zealand
Alfred Ngaro, politician

Poland
Stanisław Jaros, executed for assassination attempts
Lech Wałęsa, 2nd president of Poland

Russia
Yevgeny Nikonov, Soviet naval war hero from Estonia

United Kingdom
Frank Chapple, union leader
Alan Charles, Police Commissioner
Liam Cunningham, actor
Ivor Linton, footballer
Stuart Pearce, footballer

United States
Elmer Baumann, union leader and politician
Thomas Bell, novelist
Clipper Darrell, superfan
Adam DeBus, baseball player
Lex Green, politician
Micky Hammon, politician
Bobby Henon, politician
Edwin D. Hill, union leader
William J. Lindsay, politician
Francis Mahoney, basketball player
Richard Christy, musician and radio personality
Mike Maronna, actor
Brian McMahan, guitarist
Donald Norcross, politician
Joseph C. Palczynski, spree killer
Thomas Harrison Provenzano, convicted murderer
Jesse Sullivan, amputee who was given a robotic arm
Donald Turnupseed, the other driver in James Dean's fatal accident
Frank Weddig, politician

See also
List of welders

References

Electricians